Res Ingold (born 1954 in Burgdorf, Switzerland) is a Swiss contemporary artist.
He is known for his superfiction airline company Ingold Airlines he started in 1982.
Res Ingold is a professor at the Academy of Fine Arts Munich.

Exhibitions and actions 
 In 1993, he participated to the group show Business Art Business at the Groninger Museum,  Groningen, Netherland, curated by Frans Has. Other artists invited included Banca di Oklahoma, Int Fish-Handel Servaas, Mark Kostabi, Name Diffusion (Marion Baruch), Philippe Cazal, Premiata Ditta, and Tecnotest.
 In 2000/2001 the exhibition ingold airlines - more than miles took place at Zeppelin Museum Friedrichshafen.
 On February 16, 2008, the gala 'Von Nagel zu Nagel' took place at the Kunst- und Ausstellungshalle der Bundesrepublik Deutschland
In 2012 the International Ornithoport (airport for birds) by Res Ingold opened on top of the Kunst- und Ausstellungshalle der Bundesrepublik Deutschland

Works in public collections

Germany
 Situatives Brachland Museum, Bochum
 Zeppelin Museum, Friedrichshafen
 Herbert Gerisch Stiftung, Neumünster
 Rolandseck station, Remagen
 Luftmuseum, Amberg

Italy
 La Serpara, Civitella d´Agliano

Publications 

 2000: Wolfgang Meighörner, ingold airlines - more than miles. Quantum Books and Zeppelin Museum Friedrichshafen. 
 2008: Walter Grosskamp and Stefan Römer, ingold - universal enterprises. Labonte Köhler Osnowski, Cologne

References

External links
 ingold universal enterprises
 Ingold Airlines | Artist

Conceptual artists
Swiss contemporary artists
Academic staff of the Academy of Fine Arts, Munich
1954 births
Living people
People from Burgdorf, Switzerland